Amphipoea fucosa, the saltern ear moth, is a moth of the superfamily Noctuoidea. It was first described by Christian Friedrich Freyer in 1830 and it is found in Europe.

The wingspan is 29–35 mm. It resembles the ear moth (Amphipoea oculea) but is larger, with the reniform orange red.

The moth flies from the beginning of June to the end of September.

The larvae feed inside the roots and stems of various grasses.

Similar species
Requiring genitalic examination See Townsend et al.,
 Amphipoea lucens
 Amphipoea crinanensis
 Amphipoea oculea

References

External links
 
  Taxonomy
 Lepiforum e.V. Includes photo of genitalia
 De Vlinderstichting 

Acronictinae
Moths described in 1830
Moths of Europe
Taxa named by Christian Friedrich Freyer